Plain Township is one of the seventeen townships of Stark County, Ohio, United States.  The 2010 census found 52,501 people in the township, 35,543 of whom lived in the unincorporated portions of the township.  Located near the city of Canton, it is one of the more populous urban townships in Ohio.

Geography
Located in the north central part of the county, it borders the following townships and city:
Lake Township - north
Marlboro Township - northeast corner
Nimishillen Township - east
Osnaburg Township - southeast corner
Canton Township - south
Perry Township - southwest corner
Jackson Township - west
Green - northwest corner

Several populated places are located in Plain Township:
Part of the city of Canton, the county seat of Stark County, in the south
The city of North Canton, in the northwest
Part of the village of Meyers Lake, in the southwest
The unincorporated community of Avondale, in the southwest
The unincorporated community of Cairo, in the north
The unincorporated community of Middlebranch, in the northeast

According to the United States Census Bureau, Plain Township has a total area of 28.5 square miles (73.81 km), of which 28.3 square miles (73.29 km) is land and 0.2 square mile (0.5 km) is water.

Name and history

When Plain Township was originally formed as a civil township, it was much larger. Lake Township became its own stand alone township in 1816 after its original formation as a survey township within Plain Township and after 1806 within Green Township. Statewide, other Plain Townships are located in Franklin, Wayne, and Wood counties.

Government

The township is governed by a three-member board of trustees, who are elected in November of odd-numbered years to a four-year term beginning on the following January 1. Two are elected in the year after the presidential election and one is elected in the year before it. There is also an elected township fiscal officer, who serves a four-year term beginning on April 1 of the year after the election, which is held in November of the year before the presidential election. Vacancies in the fiscal officership or on the board of trustees are filled by the remaining trustees.

The board is currently composed of John Sabo, Brook Harless, and Scott Haws. The current Fiscal Officer is Thomas W Wolf, CPA.

Education
A large portion of the township lies in the Plain Local School District, whose high school is GlenOak High School.  The remainder of the township (primarily north of the city of North Canton) is served by the North Canton City Schools.

References

External links
Township website
County website

Townships in Stark County, Ohio
Townships in Ohio
Urban townships in Ohio